MBQ is an original English-language manga created by Tokyopop's Rising Stars of Manga second-place winner Felipe Smith.

MBQ is an expansion of his second-place winning entry in the third Rising Stars competition. It is the story of a young man named Omario who is trying to earn a living making comics in the City of Angels.

Release
Written and illustrated by Felipe Smith, MBQ was published in North America by Tokyopop in three volumes from July 12, 2005, to October 9, 2007.

Volume list

 Japanese version
MBQ　～What's up?　転・落・人・生!!!～ (distributed by eBOOK Initiative Japan Co,. Ltd. on PC and cell phone June 15, 2007)
MBQ-テイルズ・オブ・LA-　1. 　(published by SoftBank Creative April 23, 2009)

Reception
Publishers Weekly named MBQ as one of the Best Comics of 2005.

References

External links
 MBQ at Tokyopop's website
 Felipe Smith's personal website

Tokyopop titles
2005 comics debuts
Original English-language manga
Manga creation in anime and manga